Ahmad Beiranvand (born February 1, 1985, in Khorramabad) is an Iranian poet and writer. His activities revolve around poetry, fiction, and literary criticism which his books and essays are about.

Literary career
Beiranvand published his first poetry collection titled Illumination in Sunlessness by Mina publication in 2005. Between 2005 and 2010, he studied ancient texts and modern prose and also investigated poetic trends after Nima. The result of these studies was the publication of the book Commentary on Commentary in which he analyzed the poetic trends after Nima and the publication of the book Gabriel's Untold Words in which he combined modern prose and shathi texts. The book Commentary on Commentary was published by Roozegar publication and is studied in some universities in Iran as an additional source for MA students. Gabriel's Untold Words was also translated into English by Atoosa Rahmati and published in Sweden, but after a while it was banned in Iran. Beiranvand has also focused on fiction, for example in the essay "Manifesto of the Passing by Story" in which he proposes a new way of storytelling. Creating scientific method for photopoem together with Maryam Ehsani in Roodaki magazine and focusing on "body" poetry are among his works. For a while, he wrote stories about the world of animals together with his friends in a story-writing workshop that are going to be published. His activities also include being the jury of literary festivals, writing essays about the role of phenomenology in stories, writing plays, etc. He is currently the administrator and chief editor of the literary website avangardha.com where he follows the avant-garde movements in contemporary literature.

Published works
 Illumination in Sunlessness (Poetry collection, 2005)
 Commentary on Commentary (2010)
 Gabriel's Untold Words (Prose collection, 2011)
 The Hint Bird (Prose collection, 2011, banned in Iran in 2012)
 Poetics of Spacementalism (2013)
 Human Jungle (Short story collection, 2016)

See also
 Nima Yooshij
 Sohrab Sepehri
 Mohammad-Taqi Bahar
 Hushang Ebtehaj
 Gholamreza Ghodsi
 Ali Babachahi
 Mohammad Hoqouqi
 Heydar Yaghma
 Mohammad-Ali Sepanlou
 Fereidoon Tavallali
 Habibollah Chaichian
 Hamid Reza Shekarsari

Sources
 Hamshahri newspaper. Interview with Ahmad Beiranvand
 Mehrname magazine. A review by Ali Masoudinia on the book Commentary on Commentary by Ahmad Beiranvand
 Mehr News. The Hint Bird by Ahmad Beiranvand was banned.
 Matneno webstite. Introduction and review of Gabriel's Untold Words
 Fars News. Nademi and Mirjafari's review on the book Commentary on Commentary by Ahmad Beiranvand
 Resalat newspaper. A review by Shirzad Bastami on the poetry collection Illumination in Sunlessness by Ahmad Beiranvand
 Ketab News. An overview of the book Commentary on Commentary

Living people
People from Khorramabad
Iranian essayists
Iranian literary critics
Iranian male poets
1985 births